Allotinus apries is a butterfly in the family Lycaenidae. It was described by Hans Fruhstorfer in 1913. It is found in Asia.

Young larvae feed on coccids. Later, they live in the nest of Myrmicaria lutea ants.

Subspecies
Allotinus apries apries (Borneo, Pulo Laut, Malay Peninsula, Sumatra)
Allotinus apries dositheus Fruhstorfer, 1914 (Java)
Allotinus apries ristus Eliot, 1986 (Philippines: Palawan)

References

Butterflies described in 1913
Allotinus
Butterflies of Borneo